The RS125 is a race motorcycle built by the Honda Racing Corporation for the  Grand Prix motorcycle racing's 125 cc class. The motorcycle debuted in the 1980 season.

World Champions with the Honda RS125
The following riders won the World Championship on a Honda RS125:
 Loris Capirossi (1990 & 1991)
 Dirk Raudies (1993)
 Haruchika Aoki (1995 & 1996)
 Emilio Alzamora (1999)
 Dani Pedrosa (2003)
 Andrea Dovizioso (2004)
 Thomas Lüthi (2005)

References

RS125
Sport bikes